Eight Beat Measure is an all-male collegiate a cappella group at the Rochester Institute of Technology (RIT).

Eight Beat Measure began in 1987 as the RIT Men's Octet. Originally faculty-led and formed as an extension to the RIT Singers, the RIT Men's Octet quickly expanded their horizons and branched into the world of contemporary a cappella. They changed their name to Eight Beat Measure to reflect their new attitude, and expanded from their original eight members. The group's current repertoire consists of songs in the pop, R&B, and indie genres.

Current members

Discography

Polarized (2016)

RARB Review: http://www.rarb.org/reviews/albums/1600-polarized/

Heatin' Up (2012)

No Safety Nets (2010)

Eight Tracks

Mix 2006

Sleepless Nights

Awards 
2021 Voices Only - I'm Still Standing (Soloist: Jon Frey) was placed on Voices Only 2021
2019 ICCA Quarterfinals First Place, Outstanding Soloists (Derek Gieraltowski, Jarell Green)
2017 CARA - Best Hip-Hop/R&B Album (Polarized)
2013 BOCA - Party Rock Anthem (Soloists: Mike Purcell and Joe Kaplan ) was placed as the opening track on BOCA 2013
2013 Voices Only- Panic Station (Soloist: Jack Kelleher) was placed on Voices Only 2013
2012 Voices Only- Carry Out (Soloists: Rohit Crasta & Andrew Darling) was placed on Voices Only 2012
2011 SMACC Down - First Place, Best Arrangement (Bradley Turnbull, Honor Him/Now We Are Free), Best Choreography (Josh Goodman, It Had Better Be Tonight)
2011 CARA Nomination - Best Collegiate Male Arrangement (Bradley Turnbull, Honor Him/Now We Are Free)
2011 ACA Nomination - Favorite Album Art (No Safety Nets)
2011 ACA Nomination - Favorite Breakout or Newcomer Group

References

External links
 Official Website

A cappella musical groups